The Aquila CR1 is a sports racing car, designed, developed and built by Danish manufacturer Aquila, since 2008.

References

Sports prototypes
Sports racing cars